Manfred Manglitz (born 8 March 1940) is a German former footballer who played as a goalkeeper. Outspoken Manglitz was one of a handful of West Germany international footballers (including Klaus Fichtel, Bernd Patzke etc.) involved in the match fixing Bundesligaskandal in 1971, in consequence receiving a lifetime ban from the ordinary courts of the German Football Association. He had been, beforehand, a member of the West Germany squad at 1970 FIFA World Cup, playing four times for his country from 1965 to 1970.

References

1940 births
Living people
German footballers
Footballers from Cologne
Association football goalkeepers
Germany international footballers
Germany B international footballers
Germany under-21 international footballers
1970 FIFA World Cup players
Bundesliga players
2. Bundesliga players
Bayer 04 Leverkusen players
MSV Duisburg players
1. FC Köln players
West German footballers